Mukta Raja is an Indian politician who is serving as Member of 18th Uttar Pradesh Legislative Assembly from Aligarh Assembly constituency. She got 1,20,389 votes in 2022 Uttar Pradesh Legislative Assembly election.

References 

Living people
Uttar Pradesh MLAs 2022–2027
Bharatiya Janata Party politicians from Uttar Pradesh
Year of birth missing (living people)